LGO may refer to:

Places
 Llangynllo railway station (train station code LGO), Powys, Wales, UK
 Lalgopalganj (train station code LGO), India; see List of railway stations in India
 Langeoog Airport (IATA airport code LGO); see List of airports by IATA airport code: L
 Lingao County (region code LGO), Hainan, China; see List of administrative divisions of Hainan

People
 Local Government Ombudsman (LGO)
 L. G. O. Woodhouse (20th century), Surveyor-General of Ceylon

Other uses
 Leaders for Global Operations (LGO), a degree program at MIT
 local government ordinance (LGO)
 learning goal orientation (LGO)
 Largo Resources Ltd. (stock ticker LGO), see Companies listed on the Toronto Stock Exchange (L)
 The "LG-0" series of Gibson L Series acoustic guitar introduced in 1958, pronounced as "el gee oh"

See also

 Oldsmobile LG0, a Quad 4 engine